Opa-locka West Airport  was a county-owned public airport located 12 miles (19 km) northwest of the central business district of Miami, a city in Miami-Dade County, Florida, United States.

The airport opened in 1970 and was designed to relieve congestion at the nearby Opa-locka Airport. There was no public access to the airfield by land and it served as a remote area for touch-and-go training. Light twin-engine aircraft such as the Cessna 310 were the largest used at this airport. There were no storage facilities and no aircraft based at the airport. Expansion was limited due to the presence of wetlands. The airport had 12,100 general aviation aircraft operations in the year 2002.

The airport was badly damaged by Hurricane Wilma in October 2005. Miami-Dade County announced in June 2006 that the airport would be decommissioned.

Countyline Dragway, a one-eighth mile drag racing strip sanctioned by the International Hot Rod Association (IHRA), operated at the former airport site from January 2007 to May 2014. It was located at the intersection of U.S. Route 27 (Okeechobee Road) and Krome Avenue, just south of the Miami-Dade/Broward county line.

References

External links 
Countyline Dragway

Airports in Miami-Dade County, Florida
Defunct airports in Florida